A by-election was held for the New South Wales Legislative Assembly electorate of Kiama on 12 January 1871 because of the resignation of Henry Parkes. Parkes had resigned in October 1870 due to financial difficulties following the failure of his importing venture, but had been re-elected at the subsequent by-election. Barely one month later Parkes was forced into bankruptcy and had to resign again.

Dates

Results

Henry Parkes resigned due to bankruptcy.

See also
Electoral results for the district of Kiama
List of New South Wales state by-elections

References

1871 elections in Australia
New South Wales state by-elections
1870s in New South Wales